The Casey Football Club, nicknamed the "Demons" and formerly the "Scorpions", is an Australian rules football club based in Cranbourne East, Victoria. The club, which was known until 2005 as the Springvale Football Club and the Casey Scorpions (2006–16) and was based in Springvale, plays in the Victorian Football League (VFL). It has a reserves affiliation with the Melbourne Football Club.

The club changed its nickname to the "Demons" prior to the 2017 season to strengthen its alliance with the Melbourne Football Club, also known as the "Demons".

History
The club was founded in 1903 as the Spring Vale Football Club, and from 1915 it played at what became its traditional home ground, the Spring Vale Recreation Reserve at Newcomen Road, Spring Vale. After initially playing in the Mulgrave Football Association, the club joined the Berwick District Football Association in 1911, where it played until the Second World War; in its time in the BDFA, the club won seven premierships. After the war, the club switched to the more metropolitan-based Caulfield Oakleigh District League. After winning the 1956 premiership, the club switched to the Federal Football League, the top suburban league in the southern suburbs of Melbourne. The club became a powerhouse of the Federal League, and in its 25 years in the league from 1957–1981, it won seven premierships, including four in a row from 1960–1963, and missed the finals only twice. Overall, the club won fifteen senior premierships at suburban level.

Due to Springvale's strength as a club, it was seen as a strong contender to join the Victorian Football Association, the second-highest level of senior football in Melbourne. The club was offered entry to the VFA in 1961, after its first Federal League premiership, but the club turned down the offer, seeking to consolidate its strength in the Federal League, and worried that the proximity of Oakleigh and Dandenong could stifle its competitiveness. The club applied for VFA membership in 1978, but the VFA was not looking to expand at that time. Finally, as part of the VFA's expansion and restructure in 1982, Springvale was admitted to Division 2. Springvale won the Division 2 premiership in its second year in 1983, and was promoted to Division 1 in 1984, and narrowly avoided relegation for the next three years.

In December 1986, Springvale was earmarked for exclusion under the Association's controversial Football Organisation Review Team (FORT) recommendations, which sought to rationalise the Association to a stronger twelve-club competition in a single division, but which were never formally enacted after being rejected by the clubs. Less than a year later, after recruiting Phil Maylin and three other former League players in the pre-season, Springvale proved the FORT wrong by rising to the finals for the first time and winning the 1987 Division 1 premiership. Springvale was one of only two of the FORT review's excluded clubs to survive in the VFA beyond 1991, the other being Werribee. Springvale dominated the VFA/VFL in the late 1990s, winning four premierships in five years: 1995, 1996, 1998 and 1999.

When the VFA/VFL was aligned with the TAC Cup, Springvale was initially aligned with the nearby Oakleigh Chargers, with that affiliation lasting from 1995 until 1998. Since 1999, Springvale has been affiliated with the Gippsland Power.

By 2000, the club was hindered by its Newcomen Road ground. Aside from the rundown condition of the facilities, the surrounding area of Springvale had developed a bad reputation as a drugs hotspot, which was keeping people away. The club continued to train and play some of its games at Newcomen Road, but played most home games nomadically at a variety of south-eastern suburban grounds for the next few years, initially at Waverley Park in 2000, and then in 2001 and 2002 at venues including Moorabbin Oval and Shepley Oval. It returned almost full-time to Newcomen Road from 2003 until 2005.

In 2005, to attempt to financially secure its long-term future, the club came to an arrangement with the City of Casey, which had developed the new Casey Fields multi-sports complex in Cranbourne East and was seeking a VFL team to play there. The club moved its training and playing base to Casey Fields in 2006, and changed its name to the Casey Scorpions Football Club. This also brought the club geographically closer to its Gippsland Power affiliate.

When the VFL and the AFL Reserves merged in 2000, Springvale carried on as a stand-alone club for one season before entering reserves affiliations with Australian Football League clubs. From 2001 until 2008, the club was affiliated with the St Kilda Football Club. Since 2009, it has been affiliated with the Melbourne Football Club, which also maintains a training base at Casey Fields. In December 2016, the club was renamed the Casey Demons Football Club to strengthen the alliance with Melbourne, which is also nicknamed the Demons. The club will adopt Melbourne's traditional guernsey design from 2017, retaining the navy blue and red colours common to both teams.

Honours

Club

Individual
JJ Liston Medallists: Stuart Nicol 1990, D. Robbins 2000.
Norm Goss Medallists: D. Vernon 1987, M. Mellody 1995, K. Taylor 1996, B Delaure 1998, D. Donati 1999,  M. White 2022.
Games Record Holder: Damian Carroll 233.
Goals Record Holder: Shayne Smith 470
Longest Winning Sequence: 17 (2022)
Longest Losing Sequence: 10 (2005)

Statistics
Grand Finals won:

Senior
 1987 – Springvale 14.16 (100) d. Port Melbourne 7.20 (62) at Junction Oval
 1995 – Springvale 14.10 (94) d. Sandringham 6.15 (51) at Victoria Park
1996 – Springvale 11.7 (73) d. Frankston 10.10 (70) at Princes Park
1998 – Springvale 11.17 (83) d. Werribee 5.15 (45) at TEAC Oval
1999 – Springvale 19.11 (125) d. Nth Ballarat 9.11 (65) at TEAC Oval
2022 – Casey Demons 10.10 (70) d. Southport 5.8 (38) at Ikon Park

Division Two 
1983 – Springvale 17 9 (111) d. Brunswick 13 16 (94) at Toorak Park

Club song
The club song is sung to the tune of "The Battle Hymn of the Republic”, but changed to “it’s a grand old flag”, when they changed the club name to demons after the Melbourne/Casey affiliation began and solidified the partnership as a reserves team for Melbourne.

Honour roll 

VFA/VFL era captains and coaches

Jumpers

References

External links

 
 Full Points Footy profile for Casey Scorpions
 Casey Fields

Victorian Football League clubs
Australian rules football clubs in Melbourne
1903 establishments in Australia
Australian rules football clubs established in 1903
Netball teams in Melbourne
Sport in the City of Casey
Australian Reserve team football